Namibiana is a genus of snakes in the family Leptotyphlopidae. All of the species were previously placed in the genus Leptotyphlops.

Species
The genus contains the following species:
 Namibiana gracilior,  slender threadsnake, slender worm snake
 Namibiana labialis, Damara threadsnake 
 Namibiana latifrons, Benguela worm snake, Sternfeld's threadsnake 
 Namibiana occidentalis, western threadsnake, western worm snake 
 Namibiana rostrata, Bocage's blind snake, Angolan beaked threadsnake

References

 
Snake genera
Taxa named by Stephen Blair Hedges
Taxa named by Solny A. Adalsteinsson
Taxa named by William Roy Branch